The year 1951 was the 170th year of the Rattanakosin Kingdom of Thailand. It was the 6th year in the reign of King Bhumibol Adulyadej (Rama IX), and is reckoned as year 2494 in the Buddhist Era.

Incumbents
King: Bhumibol Adulyadej
Crown Prince: (vacant)
Prime Minister:  Plaek Phibunsongkhram
Supreme Patriarch: Vajirananavongs

Events

January

February

March

April
5 April - Queen Sirikit gives birth to a daughter Ubol Ratana.

May

June

July

August

September

October

November

December

Births
5 Apr - Ubol Ratana, Thai Princess

Deaths

See also
 List of Thai films of 1951

References

External links

 
Thailand
Years of the 20th century in Thailand
Thailand
1950s in Thailand